Victoria Brunsberg (born 2 April 1991) is an Australian team handball player. She plays for the Sydney University HC, and on the Australian national team. She represented Australia at the 2013 World Women's Handball Championship in Serbia.

References

Australian female handball players
1991 births
Living people